Joseph Siegler (September 6, 1889 – May 17, 1957) was an American Democratic politician and jurist from Newark, New Jersey who served in the New Jersey General Assembly.

Biography
Siegler was born in Newark, New Jersey on September 6, 1889. He was the son of Louis and Bertha Siegler. From age nine until entering law school, Siegler worked as a paperboy. He was a 1909 graduate of New York University Law School, and was admitted to the bar in 1910. He was married on March 25, 1913 to Edith R. Unterman. His brother-in-law was William Untermann, a Newark Police Court Judge and a Newark Democratic leader.

He was elected to the New Jersey General Assembly in 1918, and was re-elected in 1919.

In 1927, Governor A. Harry Moore appointed Siegler to serve as a Judge of the Essex County Juvenile and Domestic Relations Court. A 1937 ruling that parents could not provide home instruction for children equivalent to their training in school as members of a social group received national attention. "It is almost impossible for a child to be adequately taught in his home," he ruled. Siegler argued that juvenile delinquency was mostly a result of domestic unhappiness. He advocated that jurisdiction of the juvenile court be extended from 16 to 21; it was later extended to 19. He retired from the bench in 1938.

Siegler ran for the U.S. House of Representatives in 1942, challenging two-term Republican Robert Kean. He was defeated by 17,754 votes, 43,942 (60.82%) to 26,188 (36.25%).

He died of a heart ailment in 1957 at age 67.

References

New Jersey state court judges
New Jersey lawyers
New York University School of Law alumni
Democratic Party members of the New Jersey General Assembly
Politicians from Newark, New Jersey
1889 births
1957 deaths
20th-century American judges
Lawyers from Newark, New Jersey
20th-century American politicians
20th-century American lawyers